Deutzer Freiheit is an interchange station on the Cologne Stadtbahn lines 1, 7 and 9, located in the Cologne district of Deutz.

See also 
 List of Cologne KVB stations

External links 
 station info page 
 

Cologne KVB stations
Innenstadt, Cologne